The City of Broken Hill is a local government area in the Far West region of New South Wales, Australia. The area contains an isolated mining city, Broken Hill, located in the outback of New South Wales and is surrounded by the Unincorporated Far West Region. The city is located adjacent to the Silver City and Barrier Highways and the Broken Hill railway line.

The Mayor of the City of Broken Hill Council is Cr. Tom Kennedy, an independent politician.

Council history

Following a petition submitted by residents to the Colonial Secretary on 2 May 1888, the Municipal District of Broken Hill was first incorporated on 22 September 1888. The incorporation occurred during a typhoid epidemic, which killed 128 people, and the need for public health and water supply provisions was one of the main driving forces behind incorporation, and one of the biggest issues for the new municipality. One contemporary report commented that "The town is in a terrible state owing to defective sanitary arrangements. People continue to leave by trains daily in hundreds in view of the impending drought." As a consequence, in 1892 the private Broken Hill Water Supply Company completed construction on the Stephens Creek Reservoir, which provided the first reliable clean water supply to the town.

The first council was divided into four wards: Burke, Wills, Sturt and King, each returning three aldermen, and the first election, conducted by Charles George Gibson as Returning Officer, was held at the Broken Hill Court House on 24 November 1888. The ward system remained in place until early 1909 when the council requested that the state government abolish the wards and elect the aldermen proportionally, which was proclaimed on 24 May 1909. By 1891 the population had passed 23,000, making Broken Hill the third largest town in New South Wales, and that number continued to grow, reaching 25,000 by 1897. Civic improvements, spurred on by silver mining profits, continued during the 1890s with the construction of schools, a technical college, town hall, post offices and gaol. Timber and temporary structures gave way to brick and stone, the town's streets were paved and recreation reserves were planted with trees. The council commissioned the Town Hall, designed in the Italianate style by Whittall & Wells of Adelaide, with the foundation stone laid by Sir Henry Parkes on 3 April 1890. The hall was officially opened by the Governor of New South Wales, Lord Jersey, with the Governor of South Australia, Lord Kintore, in attendance, on 6 August 1891.

The council was renamed the Municipality of Broken Hill following the passage of the Municipalities Act, 1897 on 6 December 1897. The council's population continue to grow in this period and by 1906, the council resolved to apply for City status, being able to fulfil the city conditions set in Local Government Act, 1906, and the City of Broken Hill was proclaimed on 17 July 1907, the only municipality to do so under the 1906 act.

Later history
Following the release of the report of public inquiry that detailed ongoing infighting among councillors and their conflicts with staff and councillor interference in operational matters, on 10 January 2007 the council was dismissed by the Minister for Local Government, Kerry Hickey. The elected council was replaced by a single Administrator, with the former Broken Hill General Manager, Ken Boyle, appointed. Elections originally scheduled for September 2008 were deferred and the council remained under administration until a special election held on 5 December 2009.

In 2015, Broken Hill became the first city in Australia to be included on the National Heritage List.

Demography

Council

Current composition and election method
Broken Hill City Council is composed of nine Councillors elected proportionally as a single ward. All Councillors are elected for a fixed four-year term of office. The Mayor is elected directly by a popular vote. The most recent election was held on 4 December 2021 and the makeup of the council is as follows:

The current Council, elected in 2021, in order of election, is:

Mayors

See also

List of local government areas in New South Wales

References

External links

 
Local government areas of New South Wales
Australian National Heritage List
Far West (New South Wales)
1888 establishments in Australia